The Asia/Oceania Zone was the unique zone within Group 3 of the regional Davis Cup competition in 2018. The zone's competition was held in round robin format in Hanoi, Vietnam, from 2 to 7 April 2018. The two winning nations won promotion to Group II, Asia/Oceania Zone, for 2019.

Participating nations

Draw
Date: 2–7 April, 2018

Location: Mỹ Đình Sports Complex, Hanoi, Vietnam (indoor hard)

Format: Round-robin basis. One pool of 4 teams (Pool A) and one pool of 5 teams (Pool B). The winner of Pool A will play-off against the runner-up of Pool B and the winner of Pool B will play-off against the runner-up of Pool A to determine which two nations will be promoted to Asia/Oceania Zone Group II in 2019.

Seeding

 1Davis Cup Rankings as of 5 February 2018

Draw

Pool A

Pool B 

Standings are determined by: 1. number of wins; 2. number of matches; 3. in two-team ties, head-to-head records; 4. in three-team ties, (a) percentage of sets won (head-to-head records if two teams remain tied), then (b) percentage of games won (head-to-head records if two teams remain tied), then (c) Davis Cup rankings.

Playoffs 

  and  promoted to Group II in 2019.
  and  relegated to Group IV in 2019.

Round Robin

Pool A

Vietnam vs. Pacific Oceania

Malaysia vs. Cambodia

Vietnam vs. Cambodia

Malaysia vs. Pacific Oceania

Vietnam vs. Malaysia

Pacific Oceania vs. Cambodia

Pool B

Kuwait vs. Jordan

Qatar vs. Syria

Kuwait vs. Saudi Arabia

Qatar vs. Jordan

Kuwait vs. Qatar

Syria vs. Saudi Arabia

Kuwait vs. Syria

Jordan vs. Saudi Arabia

Qatar vs. Saudi Arabia

Syria vs. Jordan

Play-offs

Promotional play-offs

Vietnam vs. Qatar

Malaysia vs. Kuwait

Relegation play-offs

Cambodia vs. Saudi Arabia

Jordan vs. Pacific Oceania

References

External links
Official Website

Asia/Oceania Zone Group III
Davis Cup Asia/Oceania Zone